Abraham Woyna, Roman Catholic priest, bishop of Vilnius (and other offices)
Jerzy Woyna Orlewicz (born 1943),  Polish alpine skier
Marian Woyna Orlewicz (1913-2011),  Polish cross-country skier

See also

:Category:Woyna family

Polish-language surnames